'Clivia' is a German apple cultivar. It was created at the Institut für Acker- und Pflanzenbau of Müncheberg, in Märkisch-Oderland in eastern Germany, which at that time was in the German Democratic Republic. It is a hybrid of 'Geheimrat Dr. Oldenburg' and 'Cox's Orange Pippin'. It was reported as a new variety in 1964 and 1965; it was parent of a new cultivar, 'Pinova', in 1965.

Hybrids
Cultivars that descend from 'Clivia' include: 'Pilot' ('Clivia' × 'Undine'); 'Pinova' ('Clivia' × 'Golden Delicious'); 'Rubinstep' ('Clivia' × 'Rubin'); and 'Reanda'.

References

Further reading
 H. Kegler, H. Otto (1970). Investigations on fruit spotting of Clivia apples/ Untersuchungen zur Fruchtfleckung an der Apfelsorte 'Clivia'. Neue Deutsche Obstbau 1. 
National Fruit Collection page

Apple cultivars
German apples